is a Japanese singer and songwriter. She is influential in the city pop genre.

Early life and career

Taeko Onuki was born in Suginami Ward, Tokyo, in 1953. Her father was Kenichiro Onuki, a member of the Japanese Special Attack Units during the Second World War.

In 1973, she formed Sugar Babe with musicians Tatsuro Yamashita and Kunio Muramatsu. Because the dominant music style at the time was hard rock, audiences did not respond too warmly, and the group ended up splitting only three years later. In 1976, Onuki began her solo career by releasing the album Grey Skies, which carried the same sound as Sugar Babe. Her second, landmark album Sunshower was released the following year in 1977 and had a much different style, mixing pop music and jazz. In 1978 she released her third album, Mignonne, in which she worked with producer Eji Ogura, but the sales-focused process was difficult for her and the album didn't sell as expected. She took a two year break from music afterwards. Beginning from 1980, she released her “Europe” trilogy of albums: Romantique, Aventure and Cliché, taking on a more electronic sound.

Later career
In 1998, she won the 21st Japan Academy Award for Best Music Award in the movie "Tokyo biyori".

From October 5, 2005, she is served as Wednesday navigator (DJ) of the program " NIGHT STORIES " " THE UNIVERSE " of FM radio station J-WAVE in Tokyo.

On November 2, 2006, the soundtrack for the Game Boy Advance game Mother 3 was released, featuring the song "We miss you ~ The theme of love ~", which Onuki sang. She also sang the theme song for Animal Crossing: The Movie based on Nintendo's Animal Crossing video game series.

In 2009, Onuki covered Eiichi Ohtaki's song "Kimi wa Tennen Shoku" for the album A Long Vacation.

In 2020, the movie Words Bubble Up Like Soda Pop was released, for which Onuki sang the insert song "YAMAZAKURA".

On March 11, 2022, Onuki participated in the Shuichi "Ponta" Murakami tribute concert "One Last Live", performing "Tokai" and "Mon doux Soleil".

Discography

Albums

References

External links 
 
 

Living people
Japanese women singer-songwriters
1953 births
20th-century Japanese women singers
20th-century Japanese singers
21st-century Japanese women singers
21st-century Japanese singers